Farris is a lake near the Norwegian coastal town Larvik.

Farris may also refer to:

 Farris (surname), a surname
 Farris (mineral water), a mineral water named after Lake Farris
 Farris, Minnesota
 Farris, Oklahoma
 Farris Center, arena at the University of Central Arkansas
 Dub Farris Athletic Complex, sporting complex in San Antonio, Texas